The following lists events that happened during 1979 in New Zealand.

Population
 Estimated population as of 31 December: 3,163,900
 Increase since 31 December 1978: -1,300 (−0.04%)
 Males per 100 females: 99.0

Incumbents

Regal and viceregal
Head of State – Elizabeth II
Governor-General – The Rt Hon. Sir Keith Holyoake KG GCMG CH QSO.

Government
Speaker of the House – Richard Harrison.
Prime Minister – Robert Muldoon
Deputy Prime Minister – Brian Talboys.
Minister of Finance – Robert Muldoon.
Minister of Foreign Affairs – Brian Talboys.
Attorney-General – Jim McLay.
Chief Justice — Sir Ronald Davison

Parliamentary opposition 
 Leader of the Opposition –  Bill Rowling (Labour).
Social Credit Party – Bruce Beetham

Main centre leaders
Mayor of Auckland – Dove-Myer Robinson
Mayor of Hamilton – Ross Jansen
Mayor of Wellington – Michael Fowler
Mayor of Christchurch – Hamish Hay
Mayor of Dunedin – Clifford George (Cliff) Skeggs

Events 
 10 January – A fire destroys the Farmers' Co-operative Association department store in Blenheim, aided by strong northwesterly winds and a  temperature.
 17 February – an Air New Zealand Fokker F27 Friendship crashed into Manukau Harbour while on final approach to Auckland Airport 1 crew and 1 company staff member were killed.
 19 March – Cessna aircraft en route from Palmerston North to Taupo crashed onto the Desert Rd in bad weather, killing all 6 occupants
 24 May – Labour MP Malcolm Douglas is removed from Parliament six months after the 1978 general election, after an electoral petition by National opponent Winston Peters is upheld over irregularities in the votes of the  electorate. Peters subsequently replaces Douglas
 30 July – The carless days scheme is introduced, restricting private motor vehicles from driving on one day of the week.
 8 August – 1979 Abbotsford landslip: Sixty-nine homes in the Dunedin suburb of Abbotsford are left uninhabitable after  of land slips 48 metres in 15 minutes.
 3 November – The Evening Star ceases publication. The Dunedin newspaper was founded in 1863.
 28 November – Air New Zealand Flight 901 crashes in Mount Erebus, Antarctica, killing all 237 passengers and 20 crewmembers aboard.
 Two years after its official opening, the new executive wing of Parliament Buildings, known as the Beehive, is completed and occupied by the Government.

Arts and literature
Michael A Noonan wins the Robert Burns Fellowship.
 Nambassa beach festival, touring family roadshow. Whangamatā Waihi Beach Mount Maunganui and Coromandel.
 Nambassa three-day music, crafts and alternative lifestyle festival on Phil and Pat Hulses'  farm in Golden Valley, north of Waihi. Attendance 75,000 plus.
 Summer '79, outdoor arts festival in the parks of Wellington – including the Botanical Gardens, the Newtown Zoo, the Town Belt and several suburban parks.

See 1979 in art, 1979 in literature, :Category:1979 books

Music

New Zealand Music Awards
ALBUM OF THE YEAR  Street Talk – Street Talk
SINGLE OF THE YEAR  Th' Dudes – Be Mine Tonight
TOP MALE VOCALIST  Rob Guest
TOP FEMALE VOCALIST  Sharon O'Neill
TOP GROUP  Th' Dudes
MOST PROMISING MALE VOCALIST  Jon Stevens
MOST PROMISING FEMALE VOCALIST  Tina Cross
MOST PROMISING GROUP  Street Talk
PRODUCER OF THE YEAR  Steve Robinson – This Heart This Song
ENGINEER OF THE YEAR  Gerry Smith – This Heart This Song
BEST COVER DESIGN  Geoff Chunn, Peter Burt & Dale Wrightson – Just Drove Through Town

See: 1979 in music

Performing arts

 Benny Award presented by the Variety Artists Club of New Zealand to Eddie Hegan and Chic Littlewood.

Radio and television
Feltex Television Awards:
Best Current Affairs: Dateline Monday
Best Documentary: Okarito
Best Drama: The Mad Dog Gang Meets Rotten Fred and Ratsguts
Best Speciality: Spot On
Best Information: Fair Go
Best Actor: David McPhail in A Week of It
Best Actress: Barbara Ewing
Entertainer of the Year: David McPhail
Special Committee Award: Selwyn Toogood for pioneering work in Radio and Television

See: 1979 in New Zealand television, 1979 in television, List of TVNZ television programming, :Category:Television in New Zealand, :Category:New Zealand television shows, Public broadcasting in New Zealand

Film
Middle Age Spread
Sons for the Return Home

See: :Category:1979 film awards, 1979 in film, List of New Zealand feature films, Cinema of New Zealand, :Category:1979 films

Sport

Athletics
 Tony Good wins his first national title in the men's marathon, clocking 2:18:47.3.

Chess
 The 86th New Zealand Chess Championship is held in North Shore, and is won by Ortvin Sarapu of Auckland (his 16th title).

Horse racing

Harness racing
 New Zealand Trotting Cup: Lord Module
 Auckland Trotting Cup: Sapling

Motorsport
 A New Zealand team consisting of Larry Ross, Mitch Shirra, Ivan Mauger and Bruce Cribb win the motorcycle Speedway World Team Cup held at White City Stadium in London.

Netball
 5th Netball World Championships held in Trinidad and Tobago. Australia, New Zealand and Trinidad and Tobago all tied for first place.

Soccer
 New Zealand National Soccer League won by Mt. Wellington AFC
 The Chatham Cup is won by North Shore United who beat Mount Wellington 2–1 in the final.

Births
 27 January: Daniel Vettori, cricketer
 1 February: Peter Fulton, cricketer
 15 February: Hamish and James Marshall, cricketers
 15 March: Kyle Mills, cricketer
 20 March: Keven Mealamu, rugby union player
 26 March: Ben Blair, rugby union player
 12 May (In Nadi, Fiji): Amasio Valence, rugby sevens player
 15 May (in Samoa): Chris Masoe, rugby union player.
 8 June: Adine Wilson, netball player.
 2 July: Michael Papps, cricketer.
 30 July: Louise Corcoran, skeleton racer.
 3 October: Rodney So'oialo, rugby union player
 14 November: Carl Hayman, rugby union player
 20 November: Maree Bowden, netball player
 3 December: Daniel Bedingfield, pop singer
 Pete Wheeler, artist.
:Category:1979 births

Deaths
 October: Marty Johnstone, drug trafficker ('Mr Asia')
 28 November: Peter Mulgrew, mountaineer (died in Mount Erebus disaster)
:Category:1979 deaths

See also
List of years in New Zealand
Timeline of New Zealand history
History of New Zealand
Military history of New Zealand
Timeline of the New Zealand environment
Timeline of New Zealand's links with Antarctica

References

External links

 
New Zealand
Years of the 20th century in New Zealand